The Centrist Democrat International is a Christian-democratic political international. Until 2001, it was known as the Christian Democrat International (CDI); before 1999, it was known as the Christian Democrat and People's Parties International. This earlier name is still sometimes used colloquially.

It is the primary international political group dedicated to promoting Christian democracy. Although it attracts parties from around the globe, its members are drawn principally from Europe and Latin America. Some are also members of the conservative International Democrat Union (IDU), although the CDI is closer to the European-conservative political centre and more communitarian than the IDU.

Overview 
The CDI was formed in 1961 in Santiago, Chile, as the Christian Democrat World Union, building on the legacy of other Christian democrat internationals which were an alternative to the socialist internationals who tried to create a Christian-inspired third way. In 1999, it was renamed the Centrist Democrat International due to the participation of groups from other religions such as the Islamic National Awakening Party (PKB) of Indonesia.

The September 2001 leadership conference in Mexico City changed the organization's name to Centrist Democrat International, retaining its original CDI acronym. References to religion were not allowed in many Asian and African countries, and the CDI would not have been able to extend into Asia and Africa without a name change.

The CDI's European division is the European People's Party, the largest European political party. Its American equivalent is the Christian Democrat Organization of America. The Democratic Party of the United States maintains links with the CDI through the National Democratic Institute.

Timeline 

 December 1925: The first international gathering of Catholic-Christian democratic parties takes place in Paris, establishing the Secrétariat International des Partis Démocratiques d'Inspiration Chrétienne (SIPDIC). Member parties were from Belgium, Germany, Italy, France, the Netherlands, Luxembourg, Austria, Switzerland, Czechoslovakia, Hungary, Spain, Portugal, and Lithuania.
 1939 to 1945: World War II suspends the SIPDIC.
 23 April 1947: Political leaders from Argentina, Brazil, Chile, and Uruguay meet in Montevideo to create an international organization of Christian democratic parties. Representatives from Bolivia and Peru participate via diplomatic correspondence. The Declaration of Montevideo establishes the Organización Demócrata Cristiana de América (ODCA), although the name is not formalized until their second meeting in July 1949.
 3 June 1947: European Christian Democrats form the Nouvelles Équipes Internationales (NEI) in Chaudfontaine, Belgium, prompted by the Swiss a year before restarting the SIPDIC. The NEI, open to non-Catholic parties who subscribed to the principles of social democracy, sees European integration as the best way to prevent the spread of communism into western Europe and encourages exile groups from Bulgaria, Romania, Lithuania, Hungary, Poland, Czechoslovakia, and Yugoslavia to attend. The NEI plays a significant role in preparations for the Hague Congress and the establishment of the European Coal and Steel Community.
 26 July 1950: The Christian Democratic Union of Central Europe (CDUCE) is formed in New York City to assist Christian democratic parties in exile by organizing forces in opposition to communism. By 1955, it begins working with underground operatives in the Soviet bloc while trying to coordinate efforts between European and Latin American Christian Democratic parties.
 May and July 1956: The ODCA, NEI, and CDUCE meet for the first time in Paris at a gathering of 33 delegations from 28 countries to discuss the creation of a global Christian democratic organization.
 1960: The three regional Christian democratic organizations establish the Christian Democratic International Information and Documentation Centre (CDI-IDC) in Rome to provide political analyses for Christian democratic parties around the world.
 1961: The World Union of Christian Democrats (WUCD) is established in Santiago.
 1982: The WUCD changes its name to the Christian Democrat International (CDI).
 1999: The CDI changes its name to the Centrist Democrat International due to the increasing membership of non-Christian political parties. Since October 2000, some have informally referred to the CDI as the Christian Democrat and People's Parties International.

CDI member parties are generally members of the ODCA or the European People's Party (EPP, the successor of NEI).

Executive committee
The CDI executive committee consists of the president, executive secretary, and vice-presidents. The president is Andrés Pastrana Arango of Colombia and the executive secretary is MEP Antonio López-Istúriz of Spain, who is also secretary-general of the EPP.

Members of the executive committee are:
 Andrés Pastrana Arango (Colombia) – President
 Antonio López-Istúriz (Spain) – Executive Secretary
 Mário David (Portugal) – Deputy Executive Secretary
 César Maia (Brazil) – Vice-President
 Lourdes Flores (Peru) – Vice-President
 Mike Eman (Aruba) – Vice-President
 Mariano Rajoy (Spain) – Vice-President
 Juan Luis Seliman (Dominican Republic) – Vice-President
 Gonzalo Arenas (Chile) – Vice-President
 Naha Mint Mouknass (Mauritania) – Vice-President
 Abbas El Fassi (Morocco) – Vice-President
 Edcel Lagman (Philippines) – Vice-President
 Mikulas Dzurinda (Slovakia) – Vice-President
 Viktor Orbán (Hungary) – Vice-President
 Elmar Brok (Germany) – Vice-President
 Jadranka Kosor (Croatia) – Vice-President
 Adalberto Costa Júnior (Angola) – Vice-President
 Andrés Pastrana (Colombia) – Vice-President
 Luís Marques Mendes (Portugal) – Vice-President
 Wilfried Martens (Belgium) – Ex officio Vice-President (as president of the EPP)
 Jorge Ocejo Moreno (Mexico) – Ex officio Vice-President (as president of the ODCA)
 Carlos Veiga (Cape Verde) – Ex officio Vice-President

Member parties
The CDI has 80 member parties, including:

Observer parties
The CDI has 9 observers, including:
  – Heritage
  –  New Azerbaijan Party (YAP)
  – Belarusian Christian Democracy (BKhD)
  – Brazilian Social Democracy Party (PSDB)
  – Popular Union of Equatorial Guinea (PUP)
  – National Party of Honduras (PNH)
  – Fanorenana
  – Mozambican National Resistance (RENAMO)
  – Christian Democratic Movement (KDH)

See also
 Christian Democrat Organization of America
 European People's Party
 International Democrat Union
 Liberal International

Notes

Further reading

External links
 Centrist Democrat International

Christian democratic parties
Christian political organizations
Political internationals
Conservatism-related lists